Unlock My Boss is a South Korean television series starring Chae Jong-hyeop, Seo Eun-soo, and Park Sung-woong. It is based on a webtoon of the same Korean title by writer Park Seong-hyun, which was serialized on Naver. It aired from December 7, 2022 to January 12, 2023, on ENA's Wednesdays and Thursdays at 21:00 (KST) time slot.

Synopsis
The series is about a company president who gets trapped in a smartphone due to a suspicious incident, and an unemployed young man whose life changes after picking up the strange smartphone.

Cast

Main
 Chae Jong-hyeop as Park In-seong: a job-seeker who is majored in acting, and has lived a hard life, but still has not accomplished anything
 Seo Eun-soo as Jung Se-yeon: a robot-like secretary who becomes In-seong's strongest ally
 Park Sung-woong as Kim Seon-joo: president of Silver Lining, an emerging IT company

Supporting
 Lee Sang-hee as Oh Mi-ran: executive director of Beomyoung Group, the largest domestic market capitalization company
 Kim Sung-oh as Ma-pi: a loan shark
 Jung Dong-hwan as Oh Young-geun: vice chairman of Beomyoung Group
 Kim Byeong-chun as Kwak Sam-soo: a managing director at Silver Lining
 Ki So-yu as Kim Min-ah: Seon-joo's daughter
 Heo Ji-na as Jung Ji-hye: Seon-joo's live-in housekeeper

Extended
 Ahn Nae-sang as Park Jae-chun: In-seong's father
 Kim Young-sun as Choi Soo-jin: In-seong's mother
 Yoon Byung-hee as Jung Hyeon-ho: In-seong's best friend
 Choi Jin-ho as Shim Seung-bo: Seon-joo's butler
 Bang Joo-hwan as Noh Wi-je: a secretary and bodyguard
 Byun Jun-seo as Nam Sang-won: a team leader at Silver Lining
 Han Ji-sang as Choi Seong-jun: a veteran detective
 Jung Hee-tae as Managing Director Kim: a managing director at Silver Lining

Special appearances
 Jo Jae-yoon
 Jang Hang-jun
 Im Chul-soo

Release
The series was initially scheduled to premiere on November 30, 2022, but was pushed back to December 7.

Viewership

References

External links
  
 
 

Korean-language television shows
ENA television dramas
Television series by Studio N (Naver)
South Korean fantasy television series
South Korean comedy television series
South Korean thriller television series
Television shows based on South Korean webtoons
2022 South Korean television series debuts
2023 South Korean television series endings
Works about mobile phones